|}

The 1965 Chase is a Grade 2 National Hunt steeplechase in Great Britain which is open to horses aged four years or older. It is run at Ascot over a distance of about 2 miles and 5 furlongs (2 miles 5 furlongs and 8 yards, or 4,231 metres), and during its running there are seventeen fences to be jumped. The race is scheduled to take place each year in November.

The event is sponsored by Chanelle Pharma, and it commemorates 1965, the inaugural year of jump racing at Ascot. It was established in 2006, and it was originally a limited handicap. It became a conditions race in 2009 and has previously been sponsored by Amlin, Stella Artois and Christy. Prior to 2015 it was run over 2 miles and 3 furlongs.

The race was run from 1994 to 2004 as the First National Gold Cup, a limited handicap over 2 miles and 4 furlongs which was restricted to horses in their first or second season of steeplechasing.  Prior to this the race had been known as the H & T Walker Gold Cup.

Records
Most successful horse (2 wins):
 Master Minded – 2010, 2011
 Al Ferof – 2013, 2014

Leading jockey (3 wins):
 Richard Dunwoody - Church Warden (1986), Sound Man (1995), Simply Dashing (1997) 
 Tony McCoy – Upgrade (2000), Wahiba Sands (2001), Albertas Run (2009)

Leading trainer (7 wins):
 Paul Nicholls – Cerium (2006), Master Minded (2010, 2011), Al Ferof (2013, 2014), Politologue (2018), Cyrname (2019)

Winners

See also
 Horse racing in Great Britain
 List of British National Hunt races

References
 Racing Post:
 pedigreequery.com – Amlin 1965 Chase – Ascot.

External links
 Race Recordings 

National Hunt races in Great Britain
Ascot Racecourse
National Hunt chases
Recurring sporting events established in 2006
2006 establishments in England